Philip de Braose, 2nd Lord of Bramber ( 1070 – c. 1134) was an Anglo-Norman nobleman and Marcher Lord.

Origins
Philip was born about 1070 to 1073, the son of William de Braose, 1st Lord of Bramber (d.  1093/96) by his wife Eve de Boissey or Agnes de St. Clare. William de Braose had participated in the Norman conquest of England. He had been rewarded with the feudal barony of Bramber in Sussex and smaller holdings in Dorset, Wiltshire, Berkshire and Surrey.

Career
Philip as heir consolidated his paternal lands, and expanded them. In 1096 he confirmed his father's gifts to the Abbey of St. Florent. Philip de Braose conquered the Welsh borderlands at Builth and New Radnor and established new Norman lordships over them. At Builth, he constructed a motte-and-bailey fortification at the site where King Edward I later built Builth Castle in the 13th century. He seems to have gone on the First Crusade in 1103. He supported King Henry I (1100–1135) against the claim to the English throne made by his elder brother Robert Curthose, Duke of Normandy, but then in 1110 he revolted against Henry, who then confiscated his estates. He regained his lordships and lands in 1112 and was thereafter able to retain them, but in 1130 settled them intact onto his eldest son William de Braose, 3rd Lord of Bramber.

Marriage and children
He married Aenor de Totnes, sister and co-heiress of Alfred de Totnes (d. pre-1139), son of Juhel de Totnes (d. 1123/30), feudal baron of Totnes (which he forfeited c.1087) and of Barnstaple, both in Devon. In right of his wife Aenor, Philip acquired a moiety of the feudal barony of Barnstaple, the other moiety of which was held by Henry de Tracy (d. pre-1165), Aenor's brother-in-law. He had the following children:
William de Braose, 3rd Lord of Bramber, his eldest son and heir
Philip II de Braose
Basilia, a daughter
Gillian, a daughter

Death
He died between 1131 and 1139, possibly in 1134 on crusade in the Levant.

References

See also
House of Braose

Anglo-Normans
Norman warriors
People from Bramber
Anglo-Normans in Wales
1070s births
1130s deaths
Feudal barons of Bramber